Chordeumiidae is a family of crustaceans belonging to the order Cyclopoida.

Genera:
 Arthrochordeumium Stephensen, 1918
 Chordeumium Stephensen, 1918
 Lernaeosaccus Heegaard, 1951
 Ophioicodes Heegaard, 1951
 Ophioika Stephensen, 1933
 Parachordeumium Calvez, 1938

References

Copepods